Kansas Proposed Amendment 1, which was put before voters on April 5, 2005,  is an amendment to the Kansas Constitution that makes it unconstitutional for the state to recognize or perform same-sex marriages or civil unions.  The referendum was approved by 70% of the voters.

The amendment states:
(a) The marriage contract is to be considered in law as a civil contract. Marriage shall be constituted by one man and one woman only. All other marriages are declared to be contrary to the public policy of this state and are void.

(b) No relationship, other than a marriage, shall be recognized by the state as entitling the parties to the rights or incidents of marriage.

The Kansas Equality Coalition grew out of the organized but ultimately unsuccessful political opposition to the amendment. The KEC is a statewide group of people determined to end discrimination based on sexual orientation and gender identity and expression.

Impact of Supreme Court decisions
Following the Supreme Court decision in Schmidt v. Moriarty in 2014, 19 Kansas counties began issuing marriage licenses to same sex couples. Following the ruling in Obergefell v. Hodges in 2015, all Kansas counties were issuing same sex marriage certificates. The combination of the Supreme Court decisions, effectively, albeit unofficially, overturned the constitutional amendment.

References

External links
 State Ballot Measures, 2005 -- National Institute on Money in State Politics

U.S. state constitutional amendments banning same-sex unions
2005 in LGBT history
LGBT in Kansas
Same-sex marriage ballot measures in the United States
2005 Kansas elections
2005 ballot measures
Kansas ballot measures